The Tokorozawa Shooting Range is a firing range located in Tokorozawa, Saitama, Japan. It hosted the trap shooting part of the shooting events for the 1964 Summer Olympics in neighboring Tokyo.

References
1964 Summer Olympics official report. Volume 1. Part 1. pp. 138–9.

Venues of the 1964 Summer Olympics
Olympic shooting venues
Shooting ranges in Japan
Defunct sports venues in Japan
Sports venues in Saitama Prefecture
Buildings and structures in Tokorozawa, Saitama